Jnana Yoga is a book of lectures by Swami Vivekananda as transcribed by Joseph Josiah Goodwin. The lectures were delivered mainly in New York and London. These lectures were recorded by Goodwin, a professional stenographer, who later became a disciple of Swami Vivekananda.

Theme
Jnana yoga is one of the types of yoga mentioned in Hindu philosophies. Jñāna in Sanskrit means "knowledge"; the word is derived from Sanskrit jna – to know. In the book, Swami Vivekananda describes "knowledge" as the ultimate goal. According to Swami Vivekananda, freedom is the object of Jnana Yoga.

Chapters
The Necessity of Religion
The Real Nature of Man
Maya and Illusion
Maya and the Evolution of the Conception of God
Maya and Freedom
The Absolute and Manifestation
God in Everything
Realisation
Unity in Diversity
The Freedom of the Soul
The Cosmos: The Macrocosm
The Cosmos: The Microcosm
Immortality
The Atman
The Atman: Its Bondage and Freedom
The Real and the Apparent Man
The soul of everyone

See also
Karma Yoga

References

External links
Jnana Yoga full text at Archive.org

Philosophy books
Indian non-fiction books
1899 non-fiction books
Indian philosophy
Works by Swami Vivekananda
Classic yoga books
19th-century Indian books
Books of lectures